Rhodeus is a genus of cyprinid fish, consisting of 23 species called bitterlings. The scientific name is derived from the Greek word , meaning "rose". Most species in the genus are restricted to Asia, but two species are found in Europe (R. amarus and R. meridionalis).

Bitterlings are short-lived species, generally surviving only about five years. Their maximum size is 11 cm, but they are usually much shorter. Bitterlings inhabit slow-flowing or still waters, such as ponds, lakes, marshes, muddy and sandy pools, and river backwaters. Because they depend on freshwater mussels to reproduce, their range is restricted. Bitterlings are omnivorous, feeding on both invertebrates and plants.

Bitterlings have a remarkable reproduction strategy where parents transfer responsibility for the care of their young to various species of freshwater mussels (Unionidae and Margaritiferidae). The female extends her long ovipositor into the mantle cavity of the mussel and deposits her eggs between the gill filaments. The male then ejects his sperm into the mussel's inhalent water current and fertilization takes place within the gills of the host. The same female may use a number of mussels, and she deposits only one or two yellow, oval eggs into each. Early developmental stages are protected from predation within the body of the mussel. After 3 to 4 weeks, larvae swim away from the hosts to continue life on their own.

In 1936, the bitterling was thought to respond to hormones in a pregnant woman's urine, but the work was later discredited.

Species
This genus and Acheilognathus have a convoluted taxonomic history, one being at times included in the other. They are now considered separate, but some species formerly in Rhodeus are now in Acheilognathus.

There are currently 23 recognized species in this genus:
Rhodeus albomarginatus F. Li & R. Arai, 2014 
Rhodeus amarus Bloch, 1782 (European bitterling)
Rhodeus amurensis Vronsky, 1967
Rhodeus atremius D. S. Jordan & W. F. Thompson, 1914 (Kyushu bitterling)
Rhodeus colchicus Bogutskaya & Komlev, 2001 (Georgian bitterling)
Rhodeus cyanorostris 
Rhodeus fangi C. P. Miao, 1934
Rhodeus haradai R. Arai, N. Suzuki & S. C. Shen, 1990
Rhodeus laoensis Kottelat, A. Doi & Musikasinthorn, 1998
Rhodeus meridionalis S. L. Karaman, 1924
Rhodeus monguonensis G. L. Li, 1989
Rhodeus ocellatus Kner, 1866 (rosy bitterling)
Rhodeus nigrodorsalis 
Rhodeus pseudosericeus R. Arai, S. R. Jeon & Ueda, 2001
Rhodeus rheinardti Tirant, 1883
Rhodeus sciosemus D. S. Jordan & W. F. Thompson, 1914
Rhodeus sericeus Pallas, 1776 (Amur bitterling)
Rhodeus shitaiensis F. Li & R. Arai, 2011
Rhodeus sinensis Günther, 1868 (Light's bitterling)
Rhodeus smithii Regan, 1908
Rhodeus spinalis Ōshima, 1926
Rhodeus suigensis T. Mori, 1935
Rhodeus uyekii T. Mori, 1935

References

Further reading

 https://web.archive.org/web/20080821071303/http://fisc.er.usgs.gov/Carp_ID/html/rhodeus_sericeus.html